The Plaza de la Solidaridad is a plaza located in Mexico City, Mexico, adjacent to the Alameda Central.
During the sixteenth century, the area in which the park is now located was on the outskirts of the city. When the city grew and urbanized, the Convent of San Diego occupied the space.

A sculpture in the center of the square simultaneously commemorates the victims that lost their lives and honors the first responders of the 1985 Mexico City earthquake.

Gallery

References

External links
 

Plazas in Mexico City